S. N. H. S. S., Irinjalakuda is a school in  Kattungachira, Irinjalakuda, in the Kerala state of India, was established by Late Shri C.R. Keshavan Vaidyar and managed by Chandrika Educational Trust. It was established in October 1966. A Teacher's Training Institute was established on 29 April 1963 before the school and it was attached to school later. It is one of the oldest School in Irinjalakuda. Total 49 batches completed in past 50 years. Higher secondary section was added in the year 1991.

References

Schools in Thrissur district
Educational institutions established in 1966
Irinjalakuda
1966 establishments in Kerala